Li Chao (Chinese: 李超; Pinyin: Lǐ Chāo; born 15 August 1987 in Tai'an) is a Chinese football player who currently plays as a defender.

Club career
Li Chao received organized football training at Tai'an Sports School, Zibo Sports School, Beijing Guoan and Sichuan First City between 1999 and 2005. After Sichuan First City was dissolved in early 2006, he joined newly founded club Sichuan FC. Li played three seasons in China League Two and two seasons in China League One for Sichuan.

Li transferred to League Two club Fujian Smart Hero in early 2011. He followed the club as they moved to Shijiazhuang and he became the team captain in 2013. He played all 30 league matches in the 2014 season and captained the club to win promotion to the Chinese Super League. On 9 March 2015, Li made his Super League debut in the season's first match which Shijiazhuang lost to Guangzhou Evergrande 2–1.
 
On 1 January 2017, Li moved to League One side Wuhan Zall on a free transfer after Shijiazhuang were relegated to the second tier. He would make his debut on 11 March 2017 in a league game against Baoding Yingli ETS that ended in a 1-1 draw. He would go on to establish himself as a vital member of the team and he would win the division as well as gaining promotion at the end of the 2018 China League One campaign.

Career statistics 
Statistics accurate as of match played 31 December 2022.

Honours

Club
Wuhan Zall
 China League One: 2018

References

External links
 

1987 births
Living people
Chinese footballers
People from Tai'an
Association football defenders
Chinese Super League players
China League One players
China League Two players
Cangzhou Mighty Lions F.C. players
Wuhan F.C. players